Belmore Mountain is a hill in the townland of Gortgall, western County Fermanagh, Northern Ireland. The historian John O Donovan (1834) states that the indigenous population called the mountain  Bel Mor Muintir Pheodachain .

Belmore Mountain dominates the skyline in the nearby county town of Enniskillen and gives its name to Belmore Street.

Geography
Geologically dominated by limestone, outcropping of the sedimentary rock forms extensive sheer cliffs near the summit. Chemical erosion caused by the natural acidity of water has formed a cave system underneath the mountain, accessible at the village of Boho. Faulting has produced the Knockmore escarpment on the western flanks of Belmore. Other small villages and hamlets around the foot of Belmore include Letterbreen and Springfield.

Agriculture is limited due to the steep slopes and thin peaty soils on Belmore, however extensive plantations of coniferous forest can be found on the upper plateau.

In 1894, archeologist Thomas Plunkett excavated both the Eagle’s Knoll Cairn passage tomb and Moylehid ring cairn in the townland of Moylehid; one of which is situated on an eastern spur of Belmore Mountain overlooking the Erne valley.

Eponymy 
The mountain also gives its name to an Irish earldom. Somerset Lowry-Corry, 4th Earl Belmore, served from 1868 to 1872 as the 14th Governor of New South Wales, where several features are named for him: the Belmore River, the suburb of Belmore in Sydney, Belmore Park, also in Sydney and in Goulburn. The name is also associated with Belmore Forest in the Boho area.

See also 
 Caves of the Tullybrack and Belmore hills
 List of Marilyns in Northern Ireland

Notes

References 
 
 
 

Marilyns of Northern Ireland
Mountains and hills of County Fermanagh
Geology of Northern Ireland